Daniel Hautzinger (born 12 May 1998) is an Austrian football player. He plays for SV Stripfing.

Club career
He made his Austrian Football First League debut for FC Liefering on 28 July 2017 in a game against WSG Wattens.

References

External links
 

1998 births
People from Hainburg an der Donau
Living people
Austrian footballers
Austria youth international footballers
Austrian expatriate footballers
Expatriate footballers in Italy
SC Neusiedl 1919 players
FC Liefering players
Floridsdorfer AC players
2. Liga (Austria) players
Austrian Regionalliga players
Association football midfielders
Footballers from Lower Austria